Jim Wiggins (13 March 1922 – 1999) was an English actor, best known for his role as Paul Collins in the long-running television soap Brookside.

Wiggins was born in Birkenhead. An amateur actor for many years, he finally turned professional in 1978, having had careers in the Army, civil service as a teacher and later a Deputy Headmaster. As well as his role in Brookside (from 1982 to 1990), he appeared in a number of other television series. These include The Gentle Touch, The Bill, Agatha Christie's Partners in Crime, Emmerdale Farm and The Professionals. He died in London.

External links 
 
 

1922 births
1999 deaths
English male television actors
People from Birkenhead
20th-century English male actors